The 2014 Canadian American Association of Professional Baseball season was the league's 10th season of operations. Following the regular season, the playoffs were held. The Rockland Boulders captured their first championship title in just their fourth season, in the sixth game on September 8, 2014, over their rivals, the New Jersey Jackals.  Since there were only four teams in the league, the top two teams made it to the playoffs for a single championship round.

Season summary

Even though there were only four teams in the Can-Am League that season, some teams from the American Association of Independent Professional Baseball visited the Can-Am teams during regular season play. 

On July 7, 2014, Boulders Outfielder Jerod Edmondson singled off Ryan Bollinger of the Trois-Rivieres Aigles in the top of the fourth inning at Trois-Rivières, breaking the all-time Can-Am League record for career hits. His 700th career hit broke the record previously held by then-current Toronto Blue Jays outfielder Chris Colabello. 

Also, on July 7, Jackals manager Joe Calfapietra recorded his 700th managerial win, a 4-3 victory over the Quebec Capitales at Le Stade Municipal.

Standings

Playoffs

Championship finals

Rockland vs. New Jersey

Attendance

References

External links
Can-Am League website

2014 in baseball
Canadian American Association of Professional Baseball
2014 in Canadian sports
2014 in American sports